1546 Izsák, provisional designation , is a background asteroid from the outer regions of the asteroid belt, approximately 27 kilometers in diameter. It was discovered on 28 September 1941, by Hungarian astronomer György Kulin at the Konkoly Observatory near Budapest, Hungary. The asteroid was named after Hungarian astronomer Imre Izsák.

Orbit and classification 

Izsák is a non-family asteroid from the main belt's background population. It orbits the Sun in the outer asteroid belt at a distance of 2.8–3.6 AU once every 5 years and 8 months (2,070 days). Its orbit has an eccentricity of 0.12 and an inclination of 16° with respect to the ecliptic.

Naming 

This minor planet was named in memory of Imre Izsák (1929–1965), a Hungarian-born astronomer and celestial mechanician, who studied the motion of artificial satellites. He also worked at the Cincinnati Observatory and the Smithsonian Astrophysical Observatory in the United States. The official naming citation was published by the Minor Planet Center on 1 February 1980. He is also honored by a lunar crater Izsak.

Physical characteristics 

Izsák has been characterized as a generic X-, a metallic M- and a carbonaceous C-type asteroid, by PanSTARRS photometric survey, by the Wide-field Infrared Survey Explorer (WISE) and by the Lightcurve Data Base, respectively.

Rotation period 

In April 2006, a rotational lightcurve of Izsák was obtained from photometric observations by American astronomer Brian Warner at his Palmer Divide Observatory in Colorado. Lightcurve analysis gave a well-defined rotation period of 7.350 hours with a brightness amplitude of 0.31 magnitude.

Poles 

In 2016, a modeled lightcurve gave a concurring period of 7.33200 hours and determined two spin axis of (124.0°, 32.0°) and (322.0°, 60.0°) in ecliptic coordinates (λ, β).

Diameter and albedo 

According to the surveys carried out by the Japanese Akari satellite and the NEOWISE mission of NASA's WISE telescope, Izsák measures between 19.31 and 28.487 kilometers in diameter  and its surface has an albedo between 0.1153 and 0.249.

The Collaborative Asteroid Lightcurve Link assumes a standard albedo for carbonaceous asteroids of 0.057 and calculates a diameter of 42.23 kilometers based on an absolute magnitude of 10.6.

Notes

References

External links 
 Asteroid Lightcurve Database (LCDB), query form (info )
 Dictionary of Minor Planet Names, Google books
 Asteroids and comets rotation curves, CdR – Observatoire de Genève, Raoul Behrend
 Discovery Circumstances: Numbered Minor Planets (1)-(5000) – Minor Planet Center
 
 

001546
Discoveries by György Kulin
Named minor planets
19410928